Por Una Mujer Bonita is title of the studio album released by Mexican-American performer Pepe Aguilar. It was released in October 19, 1999, by Musart Records. Aguilar was awarded the Best Mexican-American/Tejano Music Performance at the 43rd Grammy Awards.

Track listing

Chart performance

Sales and certifications

References

1999 albums
Pepe Aguilar albums
Spanish-language albums
Grammy Award for Best Mexican/Mexican-American Album